Metasphenisca is a genus of fruit flies in the family Tephritidae. There are at least 25 described species in the Afrotropical and Oriental Regions. Of these, 20 occur in the continental Afrotropics and two are confined to Madagascar; three species occur in the Arabian Peninsula.

Species
Metasphenisca atricomata Munro, 1947
Metasphenisca axilatra Munro, 1947
Metasphenisca bezziana (Enderlein, 1911)
Metasphenisca bifaria Munro, 1947
Metasphenisca caeca (Bezzi, 1908)
Metasphenisca discocephala Munro, 1947
Metasphenisca ghenti Munro, 1947
Metasphenisca gracilipes (Loew, 1862)
Metasphenisca grandidieri (Bezzi, 1924)
Metasphenisca haematopoda (Bezzi, 1924)
Metasphenisca hazelae Munro, 1947
Metasphenisca interrupta (Munro, 1929)
Metasphenisca longulior (Munro, 1929)
Metasphenisca marmorea Munro, 1947
Metasphenisca micrura Hering, 1942
Metasphenisca negeviana (Freidberg, 1974)
Metasphenisca nigricans (Wiedemann, 1830)
Metasphenisca nigricosta (Bezzi, 1908)
Metasphenisca nigriseta (Bezzi, 1924)
Metasphenisca pallidifemur Hancock, 1991
Metasphenisca parallela Hering, 1935
Metasphenisca parilis Munro, 1947
Metasphenisca quinquemaculata (Macquart, 1846)
Metasphenisca reinhardi (Wiedemann, 1824)
Metasphenisca rubida Munro, 1947
Metasphenisca spathuliniforma Dirlbek & Dirlbek, 1968
Metasphenisca tetrachaeta (Bezzi, 1918)
Metasphenisca transilis Munro, 1947
Metasphenisca zernyi Hering, 1941

References

Tephritinae
Tephritidae genera
Diptera of Africa
Diptera of Asia